Anthony Leo Primavesi (1917–2011) was an English botanist best known for his work on the Flora of Leicestershire.

Publications

References

1917 births
2011 deaths
English botanists